Charles Edward Grainger (May 22, 1937 — December 10, 2022) was an American politician and journalist who served in the Alabama House of Representatives from 1970 to 1974, representing the 3rd legislative district of Alabama.

Early life and education
Grainger was born in Lawrence County, Alabama on May 22, 1937. He attended the University of North Alabama, the University of Mississippi, the University of Alabama and Southeastern Institute of Technology.

Career
Prior to entering politics, Grainger was a journalist. He was a reporter for The Birmingham News, the largest newspaper in Alabama. He worked at Teledyne Brown Engineering, retiring after 40 years to establish his own consulting firm.

In 1970, Grainger was elected to represent the 3rd legislative district of Alabama in the Alabama House of Representatives. He served until 1974.

Grainger served as the director of Cummings Research Park until his retirement in 2017. He also worked as a private economic development consultant.

Personal life and death
Grainger was married to Mary Sullenberger for 55 years. They had three children.

Grainger met multiple United States presidents over the course of his life. He met Harry S. Truman at the age of 13 after being invited to the White House to be honored for his bond sales. Grainger also met John F. Kennedy shortly before his assassination as an editor of The Valley Voice, having been invited for a luncheon to discuss resolving racial problems in the South. Four days later, Grainger was asked to help coordinate Kennedy's visit to Muscle Shoals in celebration of the 30th anniversary of the Tennessee Valley Authority.

Grainger wrote a memoir titled My Journey Through a Changing South, detailing his childhood in rural Alabama during the Great Depression. In his memoir, he claimed to have experienced several near-death experiences throughout his life, including nearly dying twice as an infant, almost drowning as a teenager, and escaping death as a young adult while flying on a small plane.

Grainger died at the age of 85 in Sandy Springs, Georgia on December 10, 2022.

References

1937 births
2022 deaths
20th-century American politicians
20th-century American journalists
Members of the Alabama House of Representatives
American male journalists
Journalists from Alabama
University of Alabama alumni
University of Mississippi alumni
University of North Alabama alumni
People from Lawrence County, Alabama
People from Huntsville, Alabama
People from Sandy Springs, Georgia